Knox City Football Club (formerly Knox City Soccer Club) is an Australian association football club from Knoxfield, a suburb of Melbourne, Victoria.  The club was formed as Bayswater Soccer Club in 1951 by German members of the Temple Society who had been sent to Australia for internment from Palestine. The club spent one season in the Victorian Premier League in 2004, however they were immediately relegated after finishing in last position. The club currently plays in Division 4 of the State League, following relegation from Division 3 after finishing last at the end of the 2012 season.

Honours
Victorian State League Division 1 Champions 1991; Runners-Up 2003
Victorian State League Division 2 South-East Champions 2001; Runners-Up 2000, 2008
Victorian State League Division 3 South-East Champions 2017
Victorian Metropolitan League Division 3 Champions 1977; Runners-Up 1974
Victorian Metropolitan League Division 4 Runners-Up 1972

External links
Club Website
Knox City OzFootball Page

Association football clubs established in 1951
Soccer clubs in Melbourne
Victorian State League teams
1951 establishments in Australia
Sport in the City of Knox